During the 2001–02 English football season, Walsall competed in the Football League First Division.

Season summary
After a disappointing start to the 2001–02 season, pressure was piling on Graydon and following an abject performance and 1–0 defeat, against local rivals West Brom, Jeff Bonser dismissed Graydon. His replacement, ex-Wolves manager Colin Lee polarised supporters, but ultimately proved to be a success. The style of football improved and Lee's signings improved the team dramatically. Relegation was avoided thanks to vital away wins against Nottingham Forest and Sheffield United.

Final league table

Results summary

Results by round

Results
Walsall's score comes first

Legend

Football League First Division

FA Cup

League Cup

Squad

Left club during season

Reserve squad

References

Walsall
Walsall F.C. seasons